The 2018–19 Professional U23 Development League is the seventh season of the Professional Development League system.

Premier League 2

Division 1

Table

Results

Division 2

Table

Results

Play-offs

See also
 2018–19 in English football

References

2018–19 in English football leagues
2018-19